Eckington railway station was a railway station to serve Eckington in  Worcestershire.

The station was opened by the Birmingham and Gloucester Railway in 1840. The buildings were "erected in the Gothic style, very much like those on some of the Scotch railways recently opened to the public."

The station closed to passengers on 4 January 1965.

References

Further reading

Former Midland Railway stations
Railway stations in Great Britain opened in 1840
Railway stations in Great Britain closed in 1965
Disused railway stations in Worcestershire
Beeching closures in England